Titanomyrma is a genus of prehistoric giant ant. The latest species to be discovered, T. lubei, was described in 2011, when a 49.5-million-year-old fossilized winged queen ant, comparable in size to hummingbirds, was found in Wyoming, United States. This fossil is the first fossil of a giant ant found in the Western Hemisphere. The presence of Titanomyrma in North America is considered to indicate "the first reported cross-Arctic dispersal by a thermophilic insect group". Another fossil species of this genus, T. gigantea, is the largest-known fossil or extant species of giant ant in the world.

Discovery

The fossil ant Titanomyrma lubei was discovered in ancient lake sediments in the DMNS locality 784, Farson Fish Beds, Laney Member of the Green River Formation; Sweetwater County, Wyoming, USA by Louis Lube, the collector and donor of the holotype specimen.

The fossil is part of the collection of Denver Museum of Nature and Science and was discovered by Bruce Archibald and co-author and museum chief curator Kirk R. Johnson while casually going through storage drawers. The fossil depicts the queen ant only and no fossils of workers have been found. With the discovery of Titanomyrma lubei and the description of the genus, two other species of giant ants, Formicium giganteum and Formicium simillima, were reclassified into this genus.

Well preserved fossils of T. gigantea and T. simillima were discovered in the Messel shales, near the village of Messel, in the state of Hessen, 30 km south of Frankfurt am Main (Darmstadt Administrative District), in Germany. A related undescribed species has been found in the nearby Eckfeld Maar.

Etymology
The name of the genus is a derivative of the Greek , meaning 'one of prodigious size, strength, or achievement', and alluding to the Titans of Greek mythology; and the Greek word  meaning 'ant', gender feminine. The specific epithet of the new species is formed from the surname of the collector of the holotype, Louis Lube.

Taxonomy

Archibald et al. in 2011 erected the genus Titanomyrma, described the species Titanomyrma lubei and proposed two new combinations, T. gigantea (formerly Formicium giganteum Lutz, 1986) and T. simillima (formerly F. simillimum Lutz, 1986). T. gigantea has been designated the type species for the genus.

The genus Titanomyrma is differentiated from others in the family by the shape of the gaster which is variable. In the three included species the gaster ranges from ovate to more slender or cylindrical. The A5 abdominal segment width relative to other gaster segments is variable and the relative lengths of A3–A7 are also variable.

The queens of the three Titanomyrma can be distinguished from those of other genera most easily by gaster characters. The gasters are more slender in Titanomyrma. Amongst the three species of Titanomyrma, the ratio between length to width of the queens of the three species is as follows, T. lubei – 2.14, T. gigantea – 1.40, and T. simillima – 1.50. The middle half of T. lubei is roughly cylindrical while for other Titanomyrma species, it is ovate with the segment A5 being the widest. The segment A3 has a length about a quarter of the width while for other species it is about a third. The segment A4 is thrice as long as the length of segment A3 while that of A4 segments of other species is less than twice. The segment A5–6 of T. lubei is approximately half as long as it is wide while for other species it is about a third. A3 is not curved around the petiole at the junction.

T. gigantea is the largest giant ant ever found, larger than the biggest extant giant ants, which are the  driver ants of the genus Dorylus, found in Central and East Africa.

Paleo-ecological implications

The fossils of Titanomyrma gigantea, the first of the genus to be discovered, are very well preserved. They show that T. gigantea did not possess a sting and did not have a closing mechanism on the crop. It is surmised that it must have sprayed formic acid as a defence, and either ate fresh food, in the manner of leafcutter ants (which eat only the fungi they personally cultivate in their nests), or was carnivorous. Modern relatives include driver ants. Titanomyrma may have been a precursor species, possibly following a raiding lifestyle and butchering large animals.

T. lubei is related to fossil giant ants previously found in Germany and in the Isle of Wight in southern England dating from the same period. It is the first complete giant ant fossil from North America; previous evidence that big ants lived in North America during the Eocene included an ancient ant wing from Tennessee. It is a further example, in the northern temperate regions, of tropical fauna and flora such as hippopotamus precursors, tropical plankton and pollen from tropical palms. T. lubei supports the idea that during the Eocene, conditions such as land bridges and hot spells existed which permitted the spread of ancient warmth-loving insects and other forms of life from Europe to North America or vice versa, which would not have occurred had the temperature been uniformly cool throughout.

References

External links

Eocene insects of North America
Formiciinae
Eocene insects
Fossil taxa described in 2011
Fossil ant genera